Ashley Hart (born 10 July 1956) is a New Zealand cricketer. He played in 31 first-class and 17 List A matches for Canterbury from 1981 to 1986.

See also
 List of Canterbury representative cricketers

References

External links
 

1956 births
Living people
New Zealand cricketers
Canterbury cricketers
Cricketers from Blenheim, New Zealand